Catocala rhodosoma is a moth in the family Erebidae first described by Röber in 1927. It is found in the Naga Hills of India.

References

rhodosoma
Moths described in 1927
Moths of Asia